This table displays the top-rated primetime television series of the 1967–68 season as measured by Nielsen Media Research.

References

1967 in American television
1968 in American television
1967-related lists
1968-related lists
Lists of American television series